Sad Inheritance! (Spanish: ¡Triste herencia!) is an 1899 oil painting by Spanish artist Joaquín Sorolla.  The painting was held by Episcopal Church of the Ascension in New York for many years, until it was bought in 1981 by the Savings Bank of Valencia (now part of Bankia).

The large work measures . They have been brought to the beach by a black-clothed monk from the Valencian , to bathe in the seawater as a therapeutic measure. In the background, some children are already in the sea.  

Sorolla reported coming across the scene himself, writing 
Estaba ocupado una mañana en hacer un boceto de pescadores valencianos, cuando distinguí a lo lejos, cerca del mar, un grupo de niños desnudos, a corta distancia de ellos, la figura de un sacerdote solitario. Eran los Niños del Hospital de San Juan de Dios, resaca de la sociedad, ciegos, locos, enclenques o leprosos. Inútil decir que la presencia de aquellos desgraciados me produjo una penosa impresión. No perdí el momento, y pedí y obtuve del director del Hospital la necesaria autorización para trabajar sobre el terreno y copiar aquel cuadro al natural.<p>("I was busy one morning making a sketch of Valencian fishermen, when I saw in the distance, near the sea, a group of naked children, a short distance from a single priest.  They were children from the Hospital of San Juan de Dios, the detritus of society, blind, mad, disabled or leprous.  Needless to say that the presence of those unfortunates made a painful impression on me.  I did not miss the moment and sought and obtained the necessary authorization from the director of the Hospital to work on the spot and copy that scene from life.")

Sorolla exhibited the painting with other works at the Exposition Universelle in Paris in 1900, where he was award the grand prize, and he was awarded a medal of honour (medalla de honor) when it was exhibited at the National Exhibition of Fine Arts in Madrid in 1901.  He offered to sell the painting to the Spanish state for 40,000 pesetas, but the acquisition was blocked by Conservative politicians.

The painting was sold in 1902 to the dealer Jesus Vidal in New York for the same price, 40,000 pesetas, and it was sold on in 1904 to John E. Berwind.  It was exhibited at the Hispanic Society of America in New York in 1909.  Berwind gave it to the Episcopal Church of the Ascension on Fifth Avenue in New York, where it remained for many years.

An oil study was sold at Sotheby's in London in 2014 for £182,500; Sorolla had given this as a gift to his friend William Laparra in 1906.  Sorolla gave a different sketch to John Singer Sargent in 1903 (now in the Masaveu Collection in Madrid), and a third study was given to William Merritt Chase also in 1906.

References
 " '¡Triste herencia!' de Sorolla viaja a Madrid", Las Provincias, 15 April 2009 (Spanish)
 Catalogue, Museo Sorolla, Ministerio de Cultura y Deporte (Spanish)
         Joaquín Sorolla, Study for Sad Inheritance, Sotheby's, 10 December 2014
 "La '¡Triste herencia!' de Joaquín Sorolla llega por primera vez a Irlanda de la mano de la National Gallery", 20 Minutos Editora, 9 August 2019 (Spanish)
 "Subasta del cuadro 'Triste herencia', de Sorolla", El País, 22 April 1981 (Spanish)
 "Notes on People; Church to Sell a Painting That Is Both Loved and Hated", The New York Times, May 11, 1981
 "Triste herencia. Joaquín Sorolla.", loff.it, 2 June 2013 (Spanish)
 "Triste Herencia. J. Sorolla. 1899.", Hablando De Art, 12 April 2013 (Spanish)
 "De 'Triste Herencia', de Joaquín Sorolla, a 'Baño De Niños Tullidos', de Andrés Fabert, en la Playa del Cabañal, de Valencia.", Joan Vendrell i Campmany, 2 March 2015 (Spanish)
 "Revive el Museo Carmen Thyssen de Málaga", El Sol de Mexico, 6 October 2016 (Spanish)

1899 paintings
Paintings of children
Disability in the arts
Paintings by Joaquín Sorolla